DXLX (100.7 FM), broadcasting as Barangay FM 100.7, is a radio station owned and operated by GMA Network Inc. The station's studio and offices are located at the 2nd floor, Centro Mariano Bldg., Sergio Osmeña St., Cagayan de Oro, while its transmitter is located at GMA Transmitter Site, Malasag, Brgy. Cugman, Cagayan de Oro.

History

1981-1992: LX 100.7
The station began operations in 1981 as LX 100.7: The Romantic Touch. It was the second FM station of the Romantic Touch network under the ownership of Republic Broadcasting System; a year after DYRT in Cebu was established under the such branding on February 4, 1980. The station carrying an easy listening format using the English medium. However, it went off the air on April 29, 1992.

1995-2014: Campus Radio 100.7
On March 1, 1995, after 3 years of silence, the station went back on the air as Campus Radio 100.7, with the slogan "Forever"; the same day when Mike Enriquez took over GMA's radio operations under the RGMA Network. At the same time, it switched to a mass-based format. However in 1998 when GMA Cagayan de Oro was established, it changed its slogan to Nindota Ah! similar to Cebu station. It became its permanent slogan along with Davao station and changed its medium to Cebuano.  On July 29, 2002, it was rebranded as 100.7 Wow FM with the slogan Wow! Nindota Ah!. Then it return the Campus Radio branding with the Wow! Nindota Ah! slogan retained.

2014-present: Barangay 100.7
On February 17, 2014, as part of RGMA's brand unification, the station rebranded as Barangay 100.7 and carried-over the slogan "Isang Bansa, Isang Barangay". Following the launch, it began simulcasting a handful of programs from its flagship station in Manila. In 2016, it became Barangay FM 100.7 and return it's slogan, Nindota Ah! from before. In 2020, the station re-adapted its slogan "Forever" while the old slogan retained for some reason.

References

Barangay FM stations
Radio stations in Cagayan de Oro
Radio stations established in 1981